Royal Crown may refer to:
A royal crown; an emblem of the monarchies.
RC Cola; a soft drink.